Rouget's rail (Rougetius rougetii) is a species of bird in the family Rallidae. It is the only member of the genus Rougetius. It is found in Eritrea and Ethiopia.

Habitat
Its natural habitats are subtropical or tropical high-altitude shrubland, subtropical or tropical high-altitude grassland, rivers, swamps, freshwater marshes, pastureland, rural gardens, and urban areas.
It is threatened by habitat loss.

Gallery

References

Rallidae
Birds of the Horn of Africa
Birds described in 1843
Taxonomy articles created by Polbot